Anthony Adams (born 1980) is a former American football player.

Anthony Adams may also refer to:

Anthony Adams (California politician) (born 1971), former California State Assemblyman
Anthony Adams (Michigan politician), former deputy-mayor of Detroit
Anthony Adams (optometrist) (born 1940), Australian-American optometrist
Anthony Adams (fighter), American mixed martial artist
Anthony Irvine Adams, Australian public health physician
Tony Adams (actor) (born 1940), British actor born Anthony S. Adams

See also
Tony Adams (disambiguation)
Antoine Adams (born 1988), St.Kitts and Nevis track and field runner